Melvin Henry Ignatow (March 26, 1938 – September 1, 2008) was a resident of Louisville, Kentucky, who was tried for the 1988 murder of his former girlfriend, Brenda Sue Schaefer. The case was controversial since Ignatow was acquitted of the charge, but  later admitted to killing Schaefer. Under the legal principle of double jeopardy, however, Ignatow could not be tried a second time for the murder. He was instead convicted and jailed for several instances of perjury in his grand jury testimony for the case.

Murder
Ignatow and Brenda Schaefer had been in a relationship for two years at the time of the murder. Ignatow knew that Schaefer, who had complained that he was abusive, was planning to break off the involvement. He asked a former girlfriend, Mary Ann Shore, to help him plan and carry out the murder. They spent several weeks making extensive preparations. Shore testified they had "scream tested" her house and dug a grave in the woods behind it.

On September 23, 1988, Schaefer met Ignatow to return some jewelry of his that she had in her possession. Instead, Ignatow took Schaefer to Shore's house, where he pulled a gun on Schaefer and locked her in the house. Schaefer was blindfolded, gagged, and bound. Ignatow forced Schaefer to strip, photographed her in suggestive positions, raped, sodomized and beat her before killing her with chloroform. Shore took pictures while Ignatow raped and tortured Schaefer and assisted Ignatow in covering up the murder. They buried her behind Shore's house. He took Schaefer's jewelry and the exposed film.

Investigation and trial
After Schaefer's disappearance, police quickly suspected Ignatow, but were unable to locate any witnesses or physical evidence linking him to Schaefer's disappearance, or even to locate Schaefer's body. In search for any lead that could let them move forward with the case, police invited Ignatow to clear his name by testifying before a grand jury. There, he mentioned Shore's name, bringing her into the investigation for the first time. The police interviewed Shore, who eventually confessed to helping plan the murder, and to taking pictures of Ignatow as he tortured and abused Schaefer. Shore also led the investigators to the grave site, where Schaefer's badly decomposed body had been buried for over a year. The autopsy showed she had been abused, but any DNA evidence, from blood and semen, had decomposed.

The investigators convinced Shore to wear a wire, by promising only to charge her with tampering with evidence. In the surveillance, Shore told Ignatow that the FBI was hounding her and she was afraid the property behind her house was being sold and developed. He was on tape berating her for letting the FBI "rattle" her and told her he didn't care if they dug up the whole property because "that place we dug is not shallow."

Based on this recording, prosecutors charged Ignatow with murder in 1991. The trial was moved outside the Louisville/Jefferson County area, to Kenton County where far less publicity had been generated. In one section of the recorded conversation between Ignatow and Shore, in which Ignatow stated, "That place we dug is not shallow. Beside that one area right by where that site is does not have any trees by it," the jury decided that Ignatow said "safe," not "site," as police believed. This led the jurors to conclude that the discussion involved a buried safe. Furthermore, Shore, the prosecution's star witness, wore a tiny miniskirt to court and laughed during her testimony, undermining her credibility in the eyes of the jury. The defense argued that Shore, not Ignatow, had killed Schaefer.

The jury acquitted Ignatow. The judge was so embarrassed by the verdict that he took the unusual step of writing a letter of apology to the Schaefer family.  Schaefer's parents died before the trial began. According to some family and friends, their deaths were premature due to the heartbreak and stress of Schaefer's murder.

Aftermath
Six months after Ignatow's acquittal, a carpetlayer working in Ignatow's old house, which had been sold to fund his defense, pulled up a length of carpet in a hallway. Under it he found a floor vent containing a plastic bag, taped to hold it inside the vent. Inside the bag was the jewelry Schaefer had taken with her on the night of her disappearance, and three rolls of undeveloped film. When developed, the film showed Ignatow torturing and raping Schaefer, just as Shore had described. Ignatow's face was not in the pictures, but body hair patterns and moles matched him perfectly.

Ignatow faced federal charges for perjury and lying to the FBI, based on his grand jury testimony. Knowing that he could not be retried for the murder because of double jeopardy, Ignatow confessed in court at his perjury trial. He turned to Schaefer's brothers in court and said that he had killed her, but claimed that she had died peacefully. Ignatow later pleaded guilty and was sentenced to eight years and one month in prison.

On October 23, 1997, Ignatow was indicted on state perjury charges. He was released from federal prison on October 31, 1997. The state later prosecuted him on perjury charges for testimony he gave in a case against Schaefer's employer for threatening to kill Ignatow if he did not reveal where Schaefer was. He was sentenced to nine years in prison for perjury as a second degree persistent felony offender. Ignatow was released from prison for the second time in December 2006. He returned to Louisville, living in a home four miles from the house where he murdered Schaefer.

Author Bob Hill wrote a book on the case called Double Jeopardy, which became a bestseller and provoked widespread interest in the case. MSNBC and CourtTV also produced television documentaries on the case.

Brenda Sue Schaefer is buried in her family's plot in Cave Hill Cemetery in Louisville.

Death
On September 1, 2008, Ignatow was found dead in his apartment. He was 70 years old. An autopsy determined that Ignatow died from an accidental fall that lacerated his head or his arm, and that he had eventually bled to death. The neighbor who found his body stated that "It just looked like he had fell... and he tried to go to the kitchen, and there was a blood trail that way, and then it looked like he tried to make it to his room, before he made it to his room, that's where they found his body at." 

Ignatow's neighbor also described him as "a sick and elderly man, alone and struggling for help when he apparently stumbled to his death. I used to hear him all night, asking for Jesus to come get him, because he was in a lot of pain." Ignatow's son admits, "He will probably go down as one of the most hated men in Louisville... Maybe it'll just put it to rest, that we all don't have to keep dealing with this over and over. That's what I hope."

Media
The television series American Justice aired the death of Brenda Schaefer titled "Getting Away with Murder", season 9, episode 7 original air date March 15, 2000.

Investigation Discovery series, "Evil Lives Here" (S10 Ep4), had an episode about the case titled "He Got Away With Murder", which originally aired on August 8, 2021.

References

1938 births
2008 deaths
Accidental deaths in Kentucky
Accidental deaths from falls
American murderers
American perjurers
American prisoners and detainees
Ignatow
Criminal trials that ended in acquittal
Criminals from Kentucky
People acquitted of murder
People from Louisville, Kentucky
Place of birth unknown
Prisoners and detainees of Kentucky